The governor of Montserrat is the representative of the British monarch in the United Kingdom's overseas territory of Montserrat. The governor is appointed by the monarch on the advice of the British government. The main role of the governor is to appoint the chief minister.

The governor has their own flag in Montserrat, the Union Flag defaced with the territory's coat of arms. The official residence of the governor is Government House, located in Woodlands.

History

In 2003, a petition signed by 200 people in Montserrat, called upon the British government to sack the resident governor, at that time, Tony Longrigg, stating that his policies were ruining the economy of the territory. Longrigg had prevented villa owners from returning to certain areas of the territory threatened by volcanic eruption, a decision he made based on scientific advice provided by the director of the Montserrat Volcano Observatory (MVO) and the Scientific Advisory Committee.

Governors of Montserrat, 1971–present

Willoughby Harry Thompson (1971–1974)
Norman Derek Matthews (1974–1976)
Gwilym Wyn Jones (1977–1980)
David Kenneth Hay Dale (1980–1984)
Arthur Christopher Watson (1985–1987)
Christopher J. Turner (1987–1990)
David G. P. Taylor (1990–1993)
Frank Savage (1993–1997)
Tony Abbott (1997–2001)
Howard A. Fergus (2001; acting, 1st time)
Tony Longrigg (11 April 2001 – 2 April 2004)
Sir Howard A. Fergus (2004; acting, 2nd time)
Deborah Barnes Jones (10 May 2004 – 6 July 2007)
John Skerritt (6 July 2007 – 13 July 2007; acting)
Sir Howard A. Fergus (13 July 2007 – 27 July 2007; acting, 3rd time)
Peter Waterworth (27 July 2007 – 3 March 2011)
Sarita Francis (3 March 2011 – 8 April 2011; acting)
Adrian Davis (8 April 2011 – 8 July 2015)
Alric Taylor (8 July 2015 – 5 August 2015; acting)
Elizabeth Carriere (5 August 2015 – 2 January 2018)
Lyndell Simpson (2 January 2018 – 1 February 2018; acting)
Andrew Pearce (1 February 2018 – 7 March 2022)
Sarah Tucker (6 April 2022 – present)

References

World Statesmen: Montserrat
The Montserrat Newsletter

External links

 Government of Montserrat – The Governor

 
Government of Montserrat